Brave is a memoir written by actress and activist Rose McGowan released on 30 January, 2018. The book details McGowan’s childhood living as part of the controversial group Children of God and her sexual assault by Harvey Weinstein. The book was released during the same week as McGowan's documentary series Citizen Rose.

References

2018 non-fiction books
Sexual misconduct allegations
Show business memoirs